Rosita Beach is a beach in Centro, Puerto Vallarta, in the Mexican state of Jalisco. The beach borders the  Malecón and shares a name with one of the city's oldest hotels. Playa Camarones is to the north and Playa Olas Altas is to the south.

References

Beaches of Jalisco
Centro, Puerto Vallarta
Tourist attractions in Jalisco